Aubous is a commune in the Pyrénées-Atlantiques department in the Nouvelle-Aquitaine region of south-western France.

Geography

Aubous is located in the extreme north-east of the department with the northern border of the commune being the border between Pyrénées-Atlantiques and Gers. The commune is about 50 km south-east of Mont-de-Marsan and 50 km north by north-east of Pau. Access to the commune is by the D292 road from Arrosès in the south which passes through the centre of the commune and the village and continues north to join the D22 just north of the commune. The D317 from Aydie in the south-east passes through the western area of the commune before continuing south-west to join the D205. The commune is mixed forest and farmland.

The Larcis river forms the western border of the commune as it flows north-west to join the Léez north-west of Ségos. The Boutigue forms the north-eastern border as it flows east to join the Sager east of the commune.

Places and hamlets

 Brauchet
 Coulom
 Dulucq
 Gentilloun
 Héouguère
 Lacourtiade
 Lahorgue
 Moulin
 Paillou
 Pillourcq or Pilhourcq
 Plaix
 Rey
 Tapounet
 Troucat

Neighbouring communes and villages

Toponymy
The commune name in béarnais is Aubons. Michel Grosclaude proposed an etymology from the Latin man's name Albus with the suffix -ones, the whole meaning "Domain of Albus".

The following table details the origins of the commune name.

Sources:
Raymond: Topographic Dictionary of the Department of Basses-Pyrenees, 1863, on the page numbers indicated in the table. 
Grosclaude: Toponymic Dictionary of communes, Béarn, 2006 

Origins:
Census: Census of Béarn
Enumeration: Enumeration of the Viscounty of Béarn
Cassini: Cassini Map from 1750

History
Paul Raymond said, on page 16 of the 1863 dictionary, that in 1385 Aubous had 4 fires and depended on the bailiwick of Lembeye.

Administration

List of Successive Mayors

Inter-communality
The commune is part of five inter-communal structures:
 the Communauté de communes des Luys en Béarn;
 the SIVU of roads in the Garlin area;
 the SIVU of the Lées and its tributaries;
 the Energy association of Pyrénées-Atlantiques;
 the inter-communal association for the management of drinking water Luy - Gabas - Lées;

Demography
In 2017 the commune had 48 inhabitants.

Economy
The commune is part of the appellation d'origine contrôlée (AOC) zones of Madiran, Pacherenc-du-vic-bilh, and Béarn.

Culture and heritage

Civil heritage
The commune has many buildings and structures that are registered as historical monuments:
The Maison Viau Farmhouse at Lacourtiade (19th century)
A Farmhouse at Rey (1796)
A Farmhouse at Pillourcq (19th century)
A Farmhouse at Coulom (1810)
Houses and Farms (18th-19th centuries)
A Mill at Moulin (1830)
A Campsite (Prehistoric)
The Campsite of Caesar at Gentilloun (Prehistoric)

Religious heritage
The commune has two religious buildings and structures that are registered as historical monuments:
The Saint-Quitterie Devotional Fountain (18th century)
The Parish Church of Saint-Quitterie (12th century)

The Church contains many items that are registered as historical objects:

A Sanctuary Lamp (18th century)
The Altar facing (17th century)
A Cope and a Chasuble (19th century)
A Bronze Bell (1821)
4 Altar Candlesticks (18th century)
A Celebrant's Chair (18th century)
A Painting: Saint-Quitterie (18th century)
2 Statues: Saint Peter and Saint Paul (1730 & 1780)
A Retable (1730-1750)
Altar seating and a Tabernacle (17th century)
The Main Altar facing (12th century)
Altar, Altar seating, Tabernacle, Retable, Celebrant's Chair, 4 Altar Candlesticks (17th century)
A Processional Banner (20th century)
A Sanctuary Lamp (18th century)
A bank of Pews
2 banks of Pews (18th century)
Furniture in the Sacristy (18th century)
A Suspended Stoup (17th century)
A Pulpit (18th century)
Baptismal fonts and a Stoup (17th century)

See also
Communes of the Pyrénées-Atlantiques department

External links
Aubous on Géoportail, National Geographic Institute (IGN) website 
Aubous on the 1750 Cassini Map

References

Communes of Pyrénées-Atlantiques